Crypsotidia bibrachiata is a moth of the family Erebidae. It is found in Tanzania and Zimbabwe.

References

Moths described in 2005
Crypsotidia
Erebid moths of Africa